William "Will" Hams (born 14 July 1994) is an Australian rules footballer who currently plays for the Box Hill Hawks in the Victorian Football League. He previously played for the Essendon Football Club in the Australian Football League (AFL). 
Originally from Sale, Victoria, he was drafted with Essendon's only pick in the 2013 pre-season draft with pick 6. He made his debut in round 10, 2013 against  at the Sydney Cricket Ground as the substitute.

He was delisted in November 2015, however, he was re-drafted in the 2016 rookie draft. At the conclusion of the 2016 season, he was delisted again by Essendon.

On 20 December 2016, Hams joined the Box Hill Hawks.

Statistics

|- style="background-color: #EAEAEA"
! scope="row" style="text-align:center" | 2013
|
| 41 || 2 || 0 || 0 || 1 || 6 || 7 || 0 || 2 || 0.0 || 0.0 || 0.5 || 3.0 || 3.5 || 0.0 || 1.0
|-
! scope="row" style="text-align:center" | 2014
|
| 41 || 0 || — || — || — || — || — || — || — || — || — || — || — || — || — || —
|- style="background-color: #EAEAEA"
! scope="row" style="text-align:center" | 2015
|
| 41 || 3 || 0 || 2 || 8 || 8 || 16 || 1 || 6 || 0.0 || 0.7 || 2.7 || 2.7 || 5.3 || 0.3 || 2.0
|-
! scope="row" style="text-align:center" | 2016
|
| 41 || 8 || 4 || 2 || 56 || 55 || 111 || 33 || 27 || 0.5 || 0.3 || 7.0 || 6.9 || 13.9 || 4.1 || 3.4
|- class="sortbottom"
! colspan=3| Career
! 13
! 4
! 4
! 65
! 69
! 134
! 34
! 35
! 0.3
! 0.3
! 5.0
! 5.3
! 10.3
! 2.6
! 2.7
|}

Honours and achievements
Team
VFL premiership player:  2018

References

External links 

Living people
1994 births
Essendon Football Club players
Box Hill Football Club players
Gippsland Power players
Australian rules footballers from Victoria (Australia)
People from Sale, Victoria